{|
{{Infobox ship image
|Ship image=
|Ship caption=USS Manta
}}

|}

USS Manta (SS/ESS/AGSS-299), a Balao-class submarine, was the first submarine and second ship of the United States Navy to be named for the manta.

Construction and commissioningManta was laid down on 15 January 1943 by the Cramp Shipbuilding Company at Philadelphia, Pennsylvania; launched on 7 November 1943, sponsored by Mrs. Michael J. Bradley; and commissioned on 18 December 1944.

Service history
Upon completion of her shakedown cruise, Manta departed New London, Connecticut, 27 March 1945 for Hawaii via the Panama Canal. She sailed from Pearl Harbor 28 May 1945 for her first war patrol, off the Kurile Islands. Returning 16 July, she began her second patrol 8 August and ended it with the cessation of hostilities 15 August.

Returning to Pearl Harbor 10 September, Manta engaged in training through December. On 2 January 1946, she sailed for San Francisco and preinactivation overhaul. She was decommissioned 10 June 1946 and placed in the Pacific Reserve Fleet.Manta recommissioned 2 August 1949, Lt. E. H. Edwards, Jr., in command, as ESS-299. On 1 September she was redesignated AGSS-299 and ordered to Key West, Fla. For the next 4 years she operated as a target ship for experimental antisubmarine warfare projects of Operational Development Force, Atlantic Fleet.

On 5 July 1955, Manta'' departed Key West for Portsmouth, N.H., to prepare for inactivation. Towed to New London, she decommissioned 6 December 1955 and was placed in the Inactive Reserve Fleet. In April 1960 she was assigned to Naval Reserve training duties with the 3rd Naval District. Declared as excess to the needs of the Navy, she was struck from the Navy List on 30 June 1967 and sunk as an aircraft target off Hampton, Virginia on 16 July 1969.

Awards
Asiatic-Pacific Campaign Medal
World War II Victory Medal
National Defense Service Medal

References

External links  
 

 

Balao-class submarines
World War II submarines of the United States
Cold War submarines of the United States
Ships built by William Cramp & Sons
1943 ships
Ships sunk as targets
Shipwrecks of the Virginia coast